Ballad of an Old Gun is a 1986 Soviet drama film directed by Gennadi Voronin.

Plot
In a remote mountain village fathers and mothers accompany their sons to the front. According to tradition, the Highlander does not have to give up weapons of their ancestors. Mature Patimat asks lieutenant Zvorykin convey her sons Sultan and Magomed ancient ancestral daggers. He disagrees, afraid to break the charter. But you can not break the habit, so a single mother, taking up arms, she goes in search of his sons.

Cast
Patimat Khizroyeva as Patimat 
Sergei Skripkin as  lieutenant Zvorykin 
 Aleksandr Demyanenko as driver Ivanov
 Viktor Bortsov as driver Gritsenko
 Leonid Belozorovich as Kirill Tsirkachev
 Boris Klyuyev as SS officer
 Valentina Klyagina as nurse

Location 
Filming took place in Gunib (Dagestan).

See also
 Father of a Soldier (1964)

References

External links
 
  

1986 films
1980s war drama films
1980s Russian-language films
Soviet war drama films
Gorky Film Studio films
1986 drama films